Harold Orrin Lovre (January 30, 1904 – January 17, 1972) was an American Republican who was elected as a member of the United States House of Representatives.

Early life and education
Lovre was born in Toronto, South Dakota. He was married to Viola Florell. He graduated the University of South Dakota School of Law with his J.D. in 1927.

Law and political career
He was admitted to the bar in 1927 via diploma privilege and began the practice of law in Hayti, South Dakota. He twice acted as the state's attorney of Hamlin County (1929-1932 and 1937-1940) and in Watertown, South Dakota Codington County 1944-1949. He additionally served as President of the State Board of Agriculture in 1939 and 1940. He was also member of the South Dakota state senate 1941-1944.

Lovre was elected to the South Dakota Senate in 1941 and again in 1944, also serving as Chairman of the South Dakota Republican Committee in 1947 and 1948.

Congressional career
In 1949, he was elected on the Republican ticket to the 81st Congress of the United States House of Representatives from South Dakota and served from January 3, 1949 to January 3, 1957. He ran for re-election to a fifth term in 1956 but lost to George McGovern.

Later life and death
Lovre then resumed the private practice of law in Maryland until his death, living in Silver Spring, Maryland, where he died. His remains were buried at Parklawn Memorial Park in Rockville, Maryland.

References 

1904 births
1972 deaths
20th-century American politicians
People from Deuel County, South Dakota
Maryland lawyers
South Dakota lawyers
South Dakota state senators
District attorneys in South Dakota
Burials at Parklawn Memorial Park
Republican Party members of the United States House of Representatives from South Dakota
St. Olaf College alumni
University of South Dakota School of Law alumni
People from Hamlin County, South Dakota
20th-century American lawyers
Maryland Republicans